Hasanabad (also Romanized as Ḩasanābād) is a village in Kavir Rural District, Deyhuk District, Tabas County, South Khorasan Province, Iran. At the 2006 census, its population was 23, in 7 families.

References 

Populated places in Tabas County